Labiobarbus lamellifer is a species of ray-finned fish in the genus Labiobarbus found in eastern Borneo.

References

lamellifer
Fish described in 1994
Taxa named by Maurice Kottelat